Nasi or Nasoi was a village in the district of Cleitoria (the territory of Cleitor) in ancient Arcadia, Greece, located on the Ladon.

References

Populated places in ancient Arcadia
Lost ancient cities and towns
Former populated places in Greece